The NASA Neil A. Armstrong Flight Research Center (AFRC) is an aeronautical research center operated by NASA. Its primary campus is located inside Edwards Air Force Base in California and is considered NASA's premier site for aeronautical research. AFRC operates some of the most advanced aircraft in the world and is known for many aviation firsts, including supporting the first crewed airplane to exceed the speed of sound in level flight (Bell X-1), highest speed by a crewed, powered aircraft (North American X-15), the first pure digital fly-by-wire aircraft (F-8 DFBW), and many others. AFRC operates a second site next to Air Force Plant 42 in Palmdale, California, known as Building 703, once the former Rockwell International/North American Aviation production facility. There, AFRC houses and operates several of NASA's Science Mission Directorate aircraft including SOFIA (Stratospheric Observatory For Infrared Astronomy), a DC-8 Flying Laboratory, a Gulfstream C-20A UAVSAR and ER-2 High Altitude Platform. As of 2010, David McBride is the center's director.

Established as the National Advisory Committee for Aeronautics Muroc Flight Test Unit (1946), the center was subsequently known as the NACA High-Speed Flight Research Station (1949), the NACA High-Speed Flight Station (1954), the NASA High-Speed Flight Station (1958) and the NASA Flight Research Center (1959). On 26 March 1976, the center was renamed the NASA Dryden Flight Research Center (DFRC) after Hugh L. Dryden, a prominent aeronautical engineer who died in office as NASA's deputy administrator in 1965. The facility took its current name on 1 March 2014, honoring Neil Armstrong, a former test pilot at the center and the first human being to walk on the Moon. 

AFRC was the home of the Shuttle Carrier Aircraft (SCA), a modified Boeing 747 designed to carry a Space Shuttle orbiter back to Kennedy Space Center if one landed at Edwards.

The center long operated the oldest B-52 Stratofortress bomber, a B-52B (dubbed Balls 8 after its tail number, 008) that had been converted to drop test aircraft. 008 dropped many supersonic test vehicles, from the X-15 to its last research program, the hypersonic X-43A, powered by a Pegasus rocket. Retired in 2004, the aircraft is on display near Edwards' North Gate.

Location 
Though Armstrong Flight Research Center has always been located on the shore of Rogers Dry Lake, its precise location has changed over the years. It currently resides on the northwestern edge of the lake bed, just south of North Gate. Visitors must obtain access to both Edwards AFB and NASA AFRC. 

The Rogers Dry Lake bed offers a unique landscape well suited for flight research: dry conditions, few rainy days per year, and large, flat, open spaces in which emergency landings can be performed. At times, the bed can host a runway length of over 40,000 feet. It is home to a compass rose some 2,000 feet across, in which aircraft can land into the wind in any direction.

List of current projects 
X-56
X-57
X-59 QueSST
Dream Chaser
UAS in the NAS
TGALS

Historic projects

Douglas Skyrocket

NASA's predecessor, the NACA, operated the Douglas Skyrocket. A successor to the Air Force's Bell X-1, the D-558-II could operate under rocket or jet power. It conducted extensive tests into aircraft stability in the transsonic range, optimal supersonic wing configurations, rocket plume effects, and high-speed flight dynamics. On November 20, 1953, the Douglas Skyrocket became the first aircraft to fly at over twice the speed of sound when it attained a speed of Mach 2.005. Like the X-1, the D-558-II could be air-launched using a B-29 Superfortress. Unlike the X-1, the Skyrocket could also takeoff from a runway with the help of JATO units.

Controlled Impact Demonstration

The Controlled Impact Demonstration was a joint project with the Federal Aviation Administration to research a new jet fuel that would decrease the damage due to fire in the crash of a large airliner. On 1 December 1984, a remotely piloted Boeing 720 aircraft was flown into specially built wing openers which tore the wings open, fuel spraying everywhere. Despite the new fuel additive, the resulting fireball was huge; the fire still took an hour to fully extinguish.

Even though the fuel additive did not prevent a fire, the research was not a complete failure. The additive still prevented the combustion of some fuel which flowed over the fuselage of the aircraft, and served to cool it, similar to how a conventional rocket engine cools its nozzle. Also, instrumented crash test dummies were in the airplane for the impact, and provided valuable research into other aspects of crash survivability for the occupants.

Linear Aerospike SR-71 Experiment

LASRE was a NASA experiment in cooperation with Lockheed Martin to study a reusable launch vehicle design based on a linear aerospike rocket engine. The experiment's goal was to provide in-flight data to help Lockheed Martin validate the computational predictive tools they developed to design the craft. LASRE was a small, half-span model of a lifting body with eight thrust cells of an aerospike engine. The experiment, mounted on the back of an SR-71 Blackbird aircraft, operated like a kind of "flying wind tunnel."

The interaction of the aerodynamic flow with the engine plume could create drag; design refinements look to minimize that interaction.

Lunar Landing Research Vehicle

The Lunar Landing Research Vehicle or LLRV was an Apollo Project era program to build a simulator for the Moon landing. The LLRVs, humorously referred to as "Flying Bedsteads", were used by the FRC, now known as the Armstrong Flight Research Center, at Edwards Air Force Base, California, to study and analyze piloting techniques needed to fly and land the Apollo Lunar Module in the moon's airless environment.

Aircraft on display 
NB-52B Balls 8 NASA 008
Bell X-1E AF Ser. No. 46-063
F-104N - NASA 826
F-8 Supercritical wing - NASA 810
F-8 Digital Fly-by-wire - NASA 802
F-15B ACTIVE - NASA 837
Grumman X-29 - NASA 849
Lockheed SR-71 Blackbird LASRE - NASA 844
Northrop HL-10 Lifting Body - NASA 804
Rockwell HiMAT

Gallery

Notable employees
Neil Armstrong
Marta Bohn-Meyer
Bill Dana
C. Gordon Fullerton
David Hedgley
Bruce Peterson
R. Dale Reed
David Scott
Milt Thompson

See also 

Gromov Flight Research Institute - the Russia counterpart of the Armstrong Flight Research Centre
List of aerospace flight test centres

References

External links

X-Press official newsletter
Photo Collection for NASA Dryden Flight Research Center
The Spoken Word: Recollections of Dryden History, the Early Years, edited by Curtis Peebles
Flight Research: Problems Encountered and What They Should Teach Us by Milton O. Thompson—The early days of the DFRC

Aerospace research institutes
Aviation research institutes
Buildings and structures in Kern County, California
Edwards Air Force Base
NASA facilities
NASA visitor centers
Space technology research institutes
Science and technology in Greater Los Angeles
Aerospace engineering organizations
Flight Research Center
NASA research centers